Yên Lập Lake is a large artificial freshwater lake in Hoành Bồ District, Quảng Ninh Province, Vietnam. Work began creating the dam on Míp River and Yên Lập River in 1978. It has a capacity of 128 million cubic metres.

Lakes of Vietnam
Landforms of Quảng Ninh province